Troy G. Ward (born 4 June 1962) is an American ice hockey coach. Ward spent three years (1997–2000) as assistant coach with the Pittsburgh Penguins of the National Hockey League.

His playing career was from 1980 to 1984.

On June 30, 2011, following one year as an assistant coach, Ward was named as the new head coach of the Abbotsford Heat.

He was named the head coach of the Vancouver Giants in the Western Hockey League (WHL) for the 2014–15 season but was released of his duties November 25, 2014, after 25 games.

On June 10, 2015, the Madison Capitols announced that Ward had accepted the dual role of head coach and general manager for the team's upcoming 2015–16 season. He resigned from both positions after one season.

Awards and honors

References

External links
Troy Ward profile on HockeyDB
Troy Ward's staff profile at Eliteprospects.com

1962 births
Living people
American ice hockey coaches
People from North St. Paul, Minnesota
Pittsburgh Penguins coaches
Vancouver Giants coaches
American men's ice hockey forwards